Jérôme Golmard defeated Markus Hantschk 6–3, 6–7(6–8), 6–3 to win the 2000 Chennai Open singles event. Byron Black was the defending champion but lost in the first round to Jamie Delgado.

Seeds

  Yevgeny Kafelnikov (first round)
  Cédric Pioline (semifinals)
  Carlos Moyá (withdrew)
  Jérôme Golmard (champion)
  Byron Black (first round)
  Laurence Tieleman (first round)
  Ronald Agénor (second round)
  Andreas Vinciguerra (second round)

Draw

Finals

Section 1

Section 2

External links
 2000 Chennai Open Singles draw

Gold Flake Open
2000 Gold Flake Open
Maharashtra Open